Soul Sisters is an album by American jazz organist Gloria Coleman featuring Pola Roberts recorded in 1963 for the Impulse! label.

Reception
The Allmusic review by Brandon Burke awarded the album 3 stars, stating "One probably doesn't hear the name Gloria Coleman thrown around quite as often as other organists of the day. Similarly, the Impulse! label wasn't particularly known as a home for organ combos, but perhaps that's what makes this title the underappreciated gem that it is".

Track listing
All compositions by Gloria Coleman except where noted
 "Que Baby" – 4:05 
 "Sadie Green" – 4:30 
 "Hey Sonny Red" – 5:58 
 "Melba's Minor" – 6:26 
 "Funky Bob" (Grant Green) – 4:14 
 "My Lady's Waltz" – 6:28
Recorded at Rudy Van Gelder Studio in Englewood Cliffs, New Jersey on May 21, 1963

Personnel
Gloria Coleman – organ 
Leo Wright – alto saxophone
Grant Green – guitar
Pola Roberts – drums

References

Impulse! Records albums
Gloria Coleman albums
1963 albums
Albums produced by Bob Thiele
Albums recorded at Van Gelder Studio